Pepino Formation may refer to:
 Pepino Formation, Puerto Rico, Paleogene geologic formation of Puerto Rico
 Pepino Formation, Colombia, Paleogene geologic formation of Colombia